The Women's 25m sport pistol event at the 2010 South American Games was held on March 24, with the qualification at 9:00 and the Finals at 12:00.

Individual

Medalists

Results

Qualification

Final

Team

Medalists

Results

References
Qualification
Final
Team

25m Sport Pistol W